Decade (Live at the El Mocambo) is the first live album by Canadian rock band Silverstein, released on June 8, 2010 on Victory.

Background and release
On April 23, 2010, the band announced through their official Facebook page that Decade (Live at the El Mocambo) was to be released on  June 8, 2010. It was filmed and recorded during  March 18–21, 2010 during the band's 10th anniversary shows. The show was filmed by Robby Starbuck, who had previously directed the music videos of "Vices" and "American Dream" for the band. Four cameras were used, presumably limited by the size of the venue.

Each day the band played one of their four full-length albums in its entirety to celebrate 10 years as a band. They announced that Decade would be 'the best of' the performances. On May 5, 2010, the album was made available for pre-order with a T-shirt, poster, and signed laminate. They also announced that it would be over 2 hours long, contain 22 tracks, unseen backstage footage, and every music video including the upcoming video for "American Dream".

Decade Singles was released on June 1 and contained "Smile in Your Sleep" and "Born Dead" (featuring Scott Wade).

The album was mixed by Cameron Webb.  This was their last release on Victory Records before signing with Hopeless Records later that year.

Track listing

CD
 "Smashed Into Pieces"
 "Red Light Pledge"
 "The Weak and the Wounded"
 "When Broken Is Easily Fixed" (feat. Kyle Bishop)
 "Your Sword Versus My Dagger"
 "Fist Wrapped in Blood"
 "Discovering the Waterfront"
 "Defend You"
 "Call It Karma"
 "Bleeds No More"
 "Sound of the Sun"
 "If You Could See Into My Soul"
 "My Disaster"
 "Still Dreaming"
 "Here Today, Gone Tomorrow"
 "Already Dead"
 "Smile in Your Sleep"
 "Vices"
 "American Dream"
 "Born Dead" (feat. Scott Wade)
 "I Am the Arsonist"
 "My Heroine" (Acoustic)

DVD
 "Smashed into Pieces"
 "Red Light Pledge"
 "The Weak and the Wounded"
 "Your Sword Versus My Dagger"
 "Discovering the Waterfront"
 "Call It Karma"
 "Bleeds No More"
 "My Disaster"
 "Still Dreaming"
 "Here Today, Gone Tomorrow"
 "Already Dead"
 "Smile in Your Sleep"
 "Vices"
 "American Dream"
 "Born Dead"
 "I Am the Arsonist"
 "My Heroine" (Acoustic)

Music videos
 American Dream
 You're All I Have
 Vices (feat. Liam Cormier)
 Still Dreaming
 If You Could See Into My Soul
 My Heroine
 Discovering the Waterfront
 Smile in Your Sleep
 Smashed Into Pieces
 Giving Up

Personnel
Personnel per booklet.

Silverstein
 Shane Told – vocals
 Paul Koehler – drums
 Josh Bradford – rhythm guitar
 Neil Boshart – lead guitar
 Billy Hamilton – bass

DVD Production
 Robby Starbuck – director, producer, editor, coloured
 Greg Ephraim – director of photography
 Chris Cunningham – line producer
 Nick Rybacki – assistant editor
 Robby Starbuck, Greg Ephraim, Jamie Shaw, Ryan Williams – camera operators
 Jag Tanna – live audio recording
 Scott Komer – additional engineering
 Cameron Webb – mixing
 Alan Douches – mastering
 Eric Richter – DVD production
 Sean Sutton – DVD authoring

Silverstein 10th Anniversary Crew
 Richard Fernandes – tour management
 Kevin Kennaley – stage manager, guitar tech
 Paul-Marc Rousseau – drum tech, guitar tech
 Nicole Nechiporchik, Carly Richardson – merchandise

Artwork
 Kyle Crawford – cover art illustration
 Doublej – layout
 Josh Doll – collage
 Scott Wade – show poster
 Mark Luciani – l;ive and promo photography
 Gordie Ball – past photo
 Adam Elmakias – present photo

References
 Footnotes

 Citations

External links

Decade (Live at the El Mocambo) at YouTube (streamed copy where licensed)

Silverstein (band) albums
2010 live albums
2010 video albums
Live video albums
Victory Records live albums
Victory Records video albums
Albums recorded at the El Mocambo